

Charlotte Ganahl Walker (December 20, 1876March 23, 1958) was a Broadway theater actress.

Early life
 
Charlotte Ganahl Walker was born on December 20, 1876, in Galveston, Texas to Edwin A. Walker (1849–1889) and Charlisa (De Ganahl) Walker (1855–1934).

Stage actress
Walker made her stage debut as a teen in 1893. At nineteen 1895 she performed in London, England in a comedy called The Mummy and in the same year performed with Richard Mansfield. Later, she returned to her native Texas after marrying and had two children. In 1900, she made her Broadway debut in Miss Prinnt. She returned to the stage in 1901 and appeared with James A. Herne. She was a leading lady with James K. Hackett from 1901 to 1905. In 1907 she appeared in the Broadway hit The Warrens of Virginia whose cast also had Gladys Smith (later Mary Pickford) and Cecil B. DeMille. She appeared as June in Trail of the Lonesome Pine, in 1911. She would later reprise the role in Cecil B. DeMille's 1916 film Trail of the Lonesome Pine. David Belasco noticed her in On Parole. He signed her for starring roles in plays The Warrens of Virginia, Just a Wife, and Call The Doctor. Each of the Belasco productions was staged prior to World War I.

She continued to act on the Broadway stage. In 1923 she played with Ethel Barrymore in The School For Scandal. It was produced by the Player's Club.

Films
Walker's motion picture career began in 1915 with Kindling and Out of the Darkness. Sloth (1917) is a five-reeler which features Walker. In the third reel of this film she plays a youthful Dutch maid who is about sixteen years old. The setting is an old Dutch settlement on Staten Island, New York. The theme stresses the perils of indolence to a nation of people. It cautions against permitting luxury to replace the simple life led by America's forebears. In her later silent film work Walker can be seen in The Midnight Girl (1925) starring alongside a pre-Dracula Bela Lugosi. The Midnight Girl is one of Walker's few silents that survives.

As a film actress Walker continued to perform in films into the early 1930s. Her later screen performances include roles in Lightnin' (1930), Millie (1931), Salvation Nell (1931), and Hotel Variety (1933).

Personal life
 
Walker married her first husband, Dr. John B. Haden, on November 16, 1896, in New York City. With him she had two daughters, Beatrice Shelton Haden (born 1897) and Katherine Haden (b. 1899), who was known as the actress Sara Haden. After her divorce, she returned to the stage. Dr. Haden died in 1930. Her second husband, Eugene Walter, was a playwright who adapted the novel The Trail of the Lonesome Pine for the Broadway stage. The second marriage also ended in divorce in 1930.

Charlotte Walker died in 1958 at a hospital in Kerrville, Texas at age 81.

Filmography

Silent
Kindling (1915 Paramount) (survives)
Out of the Darkness (1915) (survives)
The Trail of the Lonesome Pine (1916 Paramount) (survives)
Pardners (1917) (lost)
The Seven Deadly Sins (1917 Triangle)
Sloth(episode) (fragment; Library of Congress)
The Seventh Sin(episode) (survives; Library of Congress)
Mary Lawson's Secret (1917) (lost)
Just a Woman (1918 US Exhibitor's Booking Corp.) (lost)
Men (1918 US Exhibitor's Booking Corp.) (lost)
Every Mother's Son (1918 Fox)(lost)
Eve in Exile (1919 Pathe) (survives; Library of Congress)
The Lone Wolf (1924 Associated Exhibitors) (lost)
The Sixth Commandment (1924 Associated Exhibitors) (lost)
Classmates (1924 First National) (lost)
The Mad Marriage (1925 Rosemary) (Lost)
The Midnight Girl (1925 Chadwick) (survives)
The Manicure Girl (1925 Paramount) (lost)
The Savage (1926 First National) (lost)
The Great Deception (1926 First National) (lost)
The Clown (1927 Columbia Pictures) (survives)
Annapolis (1928 Pathe) (survives)

Sound
Paris Bound (1929 Pathe) (survives)
South Sea Rose (1929 Fox) (lost)
Double Cross Roads (1930 Fox) (survives)                                  
Three Faces East (1930 First National) (survives)
Scarlet Pages (1930 First National) (survives)
Lightnin' (1930 Fox) (survives)
Millie (1931 RKO) (survives)
Salvation Nell (1931 Tiffany) (survives)
Hotel Variety (1933 Capitol Film Exchange) (lost)
Scattergood Meets Broadway (1937 RKO) (status unknown)

References
Notes

Bibliography
Janesville Daily Gazette, Monday, October 23, 1916, Page 6.
The New York Times, "Charlotte Walker, Actress, Dies at 81; Star on Broadway in World War I Era".

External links

Broadway portrait of Walker circa 1910
 cover Charlotte Walker, cover THE THEATER magazine, June 1908

1870s births
1958 deaths
People from Galveston, Texas
Actresses from Texas
19th-century American actresses
American stage actresses
American silent film actresses
American expatriate actresses in the United Kingdom
20th-century American actresses